An intermediate people's court is the second lowest local people's court in China.  According to the Organic Law of the People's Courts of the People's Republic of China, the intermediate people's courts handle relevant important local cases in the first instance and hear appeal cases from the basic people's courts.

List of Intermediate Courts

Intermediate people's court are found at the level of prefectures, autonomous prefectures, and municipalities across China, excluding Macau and Hong Kong:

 Aba Tibetan and Qiang Autonomous Prefecture Intermediate People's Court (Sichuan)
 Ankang Intermediate People's Court
 Anshan Intermediate People's Court
 Anshun City Intermediate People's Court (Guizhou)
 Anyang City Intermediate People's Court
 Baoding City Intermediate People's Court (Hebei)
 Baoji City Intermediate People's Court
 Baotou City Intermediate People's Court (Inner Mongolia)
 Bazhong City Intermediate People's Court (Sichuan)
 Beihai City Intermediate People's Court
 Beijing No 1 Intermediate People's Court (Beijing)
 Beijing No 2 Intermediate People's Court (Beijing)
 Bengbu Intermediate People's Court
 Benxi Intermediate People's Court
 Bijie Intermediate People's Court (Guizhou)
 Bose Intermediate People's Court
 Cangzhou Intermediate People's Court (Hebei)
 Changchun Intermediate People's Court
 Changde Intermediate People's Court
 Changsha Intermediate People's Court
 Chaoyang City Intermediate People's Court
 Chengde City Intermediate People's Court (Hebei)
 Chengdu Intermediate People's Court (Sichuan)
 Chengdu Jinjiang Intermediate People's Court (Sichuan)
 Chenzhou Intermediate People's Court
 Chifeng Intermediate People's Court (Inner Mongolia)
 Chongqing No.1 Intermediate People's court 
 Chongzuo Intermediate People's Court
 Daqing City Intermediate People's Court (Heilongjiang)
 Daxinganling area Intermediate People's Court (Heilongjiang)
 Deyang City Intermediate People's Court (Sichuan)
 Dongying Intermediate People's Court
 Erdos Intermediate People's Court (Inner Mongolia)
 Fangchenggang City Intermediate People's Court
 Fushun Intermediate People's Court
 Fuxin City Intermediate People's Court
 Fuzhou Intermediate People's Court
 Fuzhou Intermediate People's Court
 Ganzhou City Intermediate People's Court
 Ganzi Tibetan Autonomous Prefecture Intermediate People's Court (Sichuan)
 Guangyuan Intermediate People's Court (Sichuan)
 Guigang City Intermediate People's Court
 Guilin Intermediate People's Court
 Guiyang Intermediate People's Court (Guizhou)
 Han River Intermediate People's Court
 Handan Intermediate People's Court (Hebei)
 Hanzhong Intermediate People's Court
 Harbin Intermediate People's Court (Heilongjiang)
 Hebi Intermediate People's Court
 Hechi City Intermediate People's Court
 Hegang City Intermediate People's Court (Heilongjiang)
 Heihe City Intermediate People's Court (Heilongjiang)
 Hengshui Intermediate People's Court (Hebei)
 Hengyang Intermediate People's Court
 Hezhou Intermediate People's Court
 Huaihua Intermediate People's Court
 Ji'an City Intermediate People's Court
 Jiamusi City Intermediate People's Court (Heilongjiang)
 Jiangxi Yichun City Intermediate People's Court
 Jiaozuo Intermediate People's Court
 Jilin City Intermediate People's Court
 Jinan Intermediate People's Court
 Jingdezhen City Intermediate People's Court
 Jingmen Intermediate People's Court
 Jiujiang Intermediate People's Court
 Jixi City Intermediate People's Court (Heilongjiang)
 Jiyuan Intermediate People's Court
 Kaifeng City Intermediate People's Court
 Kumming Intermediate People's Court
 Laibin Intermediate People's Court
 Langfang Intermediate People's Court
 Leshan City Intermediate People's Court (Sichuan)
 Liaoyang City Intermediate People's Court
 Lijiang City Intermediate People's Court
 Liupanshui City Intermediate People's Court (Guizhou)
 Liuzhou Intermediate People's Court
 Longyan City Intermediate People's Court
 Loudi Intermediate People's Court
 Luohe City Intermediate People's Court
 Luoyang Intermediate People's Court
 Luzhou City Intermediate People's Court (Sichuan)
 Matsubara City Intermediate People's Court
 Meishan City Intermediate People's Court (Sichuan)
 Mianyang City Intermediate People's Court (Sichuan)
 Miao and Dong Autonomous Prefecture Intermediate People's Court (Guizhou)
 Mudanjiang City Intermediate People's Court (Heilongjiang)
 Nanchang Intermediate People's Court
 Nanchong City Intermediate People's Court (Sichuan)
 Nanning Intermediate People's Court
 Nanyang Intermediate People's Court
 Neijiang City Intermediate People's Court (Sichuan)
 Ningbo Intermediate People's Court
 Ningde Intermediate People's Court
 Panjin Intermediate People's Court
 Panzhihua City Intermediate People's Court (Sichuan)
 Pingdingshan Intermediate People's Court
 Pingxiang Intermediate People's Court
 Putian City Intermediate People's Court
 Puyang City Intermediate People's Court 
 Qiannan Intermediate People's Court (Guizhou)
 Qianxinan Intermediate People's Court (Guizhou)
 Qinhuangdao Intermediate People's Court (Hebei)
 Qinzhou Intermediate People's Court
 Qiqihar City Intermediate People's Court (Heilongjiang)
 Qitaihe City Intermediate People's Court (Heilongjiang)
 Quingdao Intermediate People's Court
 Qujing Intermediate People's Court
 Sanmenxia Intermediate People's Court
 Shanghai No.1 Intermediate People's Court
 Shangluo Intermediate People's Court
 Shangqiu City Intermediate People's Court
 Shangrao Intermediate People's Court
 Shaoyang City Intermediate People's Court
 Shenyang Intermediate People's Court
 Shenzhen Intermediate People's Court of Guangdoug Province
 Shijiazhuang Intermediate People's Court (Hebei)
 Shiyan Intermediate People's Court
 Shuangyashan City Intermediate People's Court (Heilongjiang)
 Suihua City Intermediate People's Court (Heilongjiang)
 Suining Intermediate People's Court (Sichuan)
 Suqian Intermediate People's Court
 Taiyuan Intermediate People's Court
 Tangshan Municipal Intermediate People's Court (Hebei)
 Tianjin No 1 Intermediate People's Court (Tianjin)
 Tianjin No 2 Intermediate People's Court (Tianjin)
 Tongchuan Intermediate People's Court
 Tongren Prefecture Intermediate People's Court (Guizhou)
 Tujia and Miao Autonomous Prefecture Intermediate People's Court
 Weihai Intermediate People's Court
 Weinan City Intermediate People's Court
 Wuhan City Intermediate People's Court
 Wulanchabu City Intermediate People's Court (Inner Mongolia)
 Wuxi Intermediate People's Court
 Wuzhou Intermediate People's Court
 Xi'an Intermediate People's Court
 Xiangfan Intermediate People's Court
 Xiangtan Intermediate People's Court
 Xianyang Intermediate People's Court
 Xiaogan Intermediate People's Court
 Xingtai Intermediate People's Court (Hebei)
 Xingxiang Intermediate People's Court
 Xinju Intermediate People's Court
 Xinyang Intermediate People's Court
 Xuchang Intermediate People's Court
 Xuzhou City Intermediate People's Court
 Ya'an Intermediate People's Court (Sichuan)
 Yaan City Intermediate People's Court (Sichuan)
 Yibin Municipal Intermediate People's Court (Sichuan)
 Yichang Intermediate People's Court
 Yichun City Intermediate People's Court (Heilongjiang)
 Yinchuan Intermediate People's Court
 Yingkou Intermediate People's Court
 Yingtan Intermediate People's Court
 Yiyang Intermediate People's Court
 Yongzhoui Intermediate People's Court
 Yueyang Intermediate People's Court
 Yulin City Intermediate People's Court
 Yulin Intermediate People's Court
 Zhangjiajie Intermediate People's Court
 Zhangjiakou City Intermediate People's Court (Hebei)
 Zhangye City Intermediate People's Court
 Zhengzhou Intermediate People's Court
 Zhoukou Intermediate People's Court
 Zhumadian City Intermediate People's Court
 Zhuzhou City Intermediate People's Court
 Zigong City Intermediate People's Court (Sichuan)
 Ziyang City Intermediate People's Court (Sichuan)
 Zunyi City Intermediate People's Court (Guizhou)

Outside of regional level there are other intermediate courts for railways and forestry:

 Beijing Railway Transportation Intermediate Court
 Chengdu Railway Transportation Intermediate Court (Sichuan)
 Forest Intermediate People's Court in Heilongjiang Province 
 Harbin Railway Transportation Intermediate Court (Heilongjiang)
 Nanning Railway Transportation Intermediate Court
 Zhengzhou Railway Transportation Intermediate Court

References

See also 

 Judicial system of China
 Local people's court

Judiciary of China